Naturally occurring neodymium (60Nd) is composed of 5 stable isotopes, 142Nd, 143Nd, 145Nd, 146Nd and 148Nd, with 142Nd being the most abundant (27.2% natural abundance), and 2 long-lived radioisotopes, 144Nd and 150Nd. In all, 33 radioisotopes of neodymium have been characterized up to now, with the most stable being naturally occurring isotopes 144Nd (alpha decay, a half-life (t1/2) of 2.29×1015 years) and 150Nd (double beta decay, t1/2 of 7×1018 years). All of the remaining radioactive isotopes have half-lives that are less than 12 days, and the majority of these have half-lives that are less than 70 seconds; the most stable artificial isotope is 147Nd with a half-life of 10.98 days. This element also has 13 known meta states with the most stable being 139mNd (t1/2 5.5 hours), 135mNd (t1/2 5.5 minutes) and 133m1Nd (t1/2 ~70 seconds).

The primary decay modes before the most abundant stable isotope, 142Nd, are electron capture and positron decay, and the primary mode after is beta decay. The primary decay products before 142Nd are praseodymium isotopes and the primary products after are promethium isotopes.

Neodymium isotopes as fission products 
Neodymium is one of the more common fission products that results from the splitting of uranium-233, uranium-235, plutonium-239 and plutonium-241. The distribution of resulting neodymium isotopes is distinctly different than those found in crustal rock formation on Earth. One of the methods used to verify that the Oklo Fossil Reactors in Gabon had produced a natural nuclear fission reactor some two billion years before present was to compare the relative abundances neodymium isotopes found at the reactor site with those found elsewhere on Earth.

List of isotopes 

|-
| 124Nd
| style="text-align:right" | 60
| style="text-align:right" | 64
| 123.95223(64)#
| 500# ms
|
|
| 0+
|
|
|-
| 125Nd
| style="text-align:right" | 60
| style="text-align:right" | 65
| 124.94888(43)#
| 600(150) ms
|
|
| 5/2(+#)
|
|
|-
| 126Nd
| style="text-align:right" | 60
| style="text-align:right" | 66
| 125.94322(43)#
| 1# s [>200 ns]
| β+
| 126Pr
| 0+
|
|
|-
| rowspan=2|127Nd
| rowspan=2 style="text-align:right" | 60
| rowspan=2 style="text-align:right" | 67
| rowspan=2|126.94050(43)#
| rowspan=2|1.8(4) s
| β+
| 127Pr
| rowspan=2|5/2+#
| rowspan=2|
| rowspan=2|
|-
| β+, p (rare)
| 126Ce
|-
| rowspan=2|128Nd
| rowspan=2 style="text-align:right" | 60
| rowspan=2 style="text-align:right" | 68
| rowspan=2|127.93539(21)#
| rowspan=2|5# s
| β+
| 128Pr
| rowspan=2|0+
| rowspan=2|
| rowspan=2|
|-
| β+, p (rare)
| 127Ce
|-
| rowspan=2|129Nd
| rowspan=2 style="text-align:right" | 60
| rowspan=2 style="text-align:right" | 69
| rowspan=2|128.93319(22)#
| rowspan=2|4.9(2) s
| β+
| 129Pr
| rowspan=2|5/2+#
| rowspan=2| 
| rowspan=2|
|-
| β+, p (rare)
| 128Ce
|-
| 130Nd
| style="text-align:right" | 60
| style="text-align:right" | 70
| 129.92851(3)
| 21(3) s
| β+
| 130Pr
| 0+
|
|
|-
| rowspan=2|131Nd
| rowspan=2 style="text-align:right" | 60
| rowspan=2 style="text-align:right" | 71
| rowspan=2|130.92725(3)
| rowspan=2|33(3) s
| β+
| 131Pr
| rowspan=2|(5/2)(+#)
| rowspan=2| 
| rowspan=2|
|-
| β+, p (rare)
| 130Ce
|-
| 132Nd
| style="text-align:right" | 60
| style="text-align:right" | 72
| 131.923321(26)
| 1.56(10) min
| β+
| 132Pr
| 0+
|
|
|-
| 133Nd
| style="text-align:right" | 60
| style="text-align:right" | 73
| 132.92235(5)
| 70(10) s
| β+
| 133Pr
| (7/2+)
|
|
|-
| style="text-indent:1em" | 133m1Nd
| colspan="3" style="text-indent:2em" | 127.97(11) keV
| ~70 s
| β+
| 133Pr
| (1/2)+
|
|
|-
| style="text-indent:1em" | 133m2Nd
| colspan="3" style="text-indent:2em" | 176.10(10) keV
| ~300 ns
|
|
| (9/2–)
|
|
|-
| 134Nd
| style="text-align:right" | 60
| style="text-align:right" | 74
| 133.918790(13)
| 8.5(15) min
| β+
| 134Pr
| 0+
|
|
|-
| style="text-indent:1em" | 134mNd
| colspan="3" style="text-indent:2em" | 2293.1(4) keV
| 410(30) µs
|
|
| (8)–
|
|
|-
| 135Nd
| style="text-align:right" | 60
| style="text-align:right" | 75
| 134.918181(21)
| 12.4(6) min
| β+
| 135Pr
| 9/2(–)
|
|
|-
| style="text-indent:1em" | 135mNd
| colspan="3" style="text-indent:2em" | 65.0(2) keV
| 5.5(5) min
| β+
| 135Pr
| (1/2+)
|
|
|-
| 136Nd
| style="text-align:right" | 60
| style="text-align:right" | 76
| 135.914976(13)
| 50.65(33) min
| β+
| 136Pr
| 0+
|
|
|-
| 137Nd
| style="text-align:right" | 60
| style="text-align:right" | 77
| 136.914567(12)
| 38.5(15) min
| β+
| 137Pr
| 1/2+
|
|
|-
| style="text-indent:1em" | 137mNd
| colspan="3" style="text-indent:2em" | 519.43(17) keV
| 1.60(15) s
| IT
| 137Nd
| (11/2–)
|
|
|-
| 138Nd
| style="text-align:right" | 60
| style="text-align:right" | 78
| 137.911950(13)
| 5.04(9) h
| β+
| 138Pr
| 0+
|
|
|-
| style="text-indent:1em" | 138mNd
| colspan="3" style="text-indent:2em" | 3174.9(4) keV
| 410(50) ns
|
|
| (10+)
|
|
|-
| 139Nd
| style="text-align:right" | 60
| style="text-align:right" | 79
| 138.911978(28)
| 29.7(5) min
| β+
| 139Pr
| 3/2+
|
|
|-
| rowspan=2 style="text-indent:1em" | 139m1Nd
| rowspan=2 colspan="3" style="text-indent:2em" | 231.15(5) keV
| rowspan=2|5.50(20) h
| β+ (88.2%)
| 139Pr
| rowspan=2|11/2–
| rowspan=2|
| rowspan=2|
|-
| IT (11.8%)
| 139Nd
|-
| style="text-indent:1em" | 139m2Nd
| colspan="3" style="text-indent:2em" | 2570.9+X keV
| ≥141 ns
|
|
|
|
|
|-
| 140Nd
| style="text-align:right" | 60
| style="text-align:right" | 80
| 139.90955(3)
| 3.37(2) d
| EC
| 140Pr
| 0+
|
|
|-
| style="text-indent:1em" | 140mNd
| colspan="3" style="text-indent:2em" | 2221.4(1) keV
| 600(50) µs
|
|
| 7–
|
|
|-
| 141Nd
| style="text-align:right" | 60
| style="text-align:right" | 81
| 140.909610(4)
| 2.49(3) h
| β+
| 141Pr
| 3/2+
|
|
|-
| rowspan=2 style="text-indent:1em" | 141mNd
| rowspan=2 colspan="3" style="text-indent:2em" | 756.51(5) keV
| rowspan=2|62.0(8) s
| IT (99.95%)
| 141Nd
| rowspan=2|11/2–
| rowspan=2|
| rowspan=2|
|-
| β+ (.05%)
| 141Pr
|-
| 142Nd
| style="text-align:right" | 60
| style="text-align:right" | 82
| 141.9077233(25)
| colspan=3 align=center|Stable
| 0+
| 0.272(5)
| 0.2680–0.2730
|-
| 143Nd
| style="text-align:right" | 60
| style="text-align:right" | 83
| 142.9098143(25)
| colspan=3 align=center|Observationally Stable
| 7/2−
| 0.122(2)
| 0.1212–0.1232
|-
| 144Nd
| style="text-align:right" | 60
| style="text-align:right" | 84
| 143.9100873(25)
| 2.29(16)×1015 y
| α
| 140Ce
| 0+
| 0.238(3)
| 0.2379–0.2397
|-
| 145Nd
| style="text-align:right" | 60
| style="text-align:right" | 85
| 144.9125736(25)
| colspan=3 align=center|Observationally Stable
| 7/2−
| 0.083(1)
| 0.0823–0.0835
|-
| 146Nd
| style="text-align:right" | 60
| style="text-align:right" | 86
| 145.9131169(25)
| colspan=3 align=center|Observationally Stable
| 0+
| 0.172(3)
| 0.1706–0.1735
|-
| 147Nd
| style="text-align:right" | 60
| style="text-align:right" | 87
| 146.9161004(25)
| 10.98(1) d
| β−
| 147Pm
| 5/2−
|
|
|-
| 148Nd
| style="text-align:right" | 60
| style="text-align:right" | 88
| 147.916893(3)
| colspan=3 align=center|Observationally Stable
| 0+
| 0.057(1)
| 0.0566–0.0578
|-
| 149Nd
| style="text-align:right" | 60
| style="text-align:right" | 89
| 148.920149(3)
| 1.728(1) h
| β−
| 149Pm
| 5/2−
|
|
|-
| 150Nd
| style="text-align:right" | 60
| style="text-align:right" | 90
| 149.920891(3)
| 6.7(7)×1018 y
| β−β−
| 150Sm
| 0+
| 0.056(2)
| 0.0553–0.0569
|-
| 151Nd
| style="text-align:right" | 60
| style="text-align:right" | 91
| 150.923829(3)
| 12.44(7) min
| β−
| 151Pm
| 3/2+
|
|
|-
| 152Nd
| style="text-align:right" | 60
| style="text-align:right" | 92
| 151.924682(26)
| 11.4(2) min
| β−
| 152Pm
| 0+
|
|
|-
| 153Nd
| style="text-align:right" | 60
| style="text-align:right" | 93
| 152.927698(29)
| 31.6(10) s
| β−
| 153Pm
| (3/2)−
|
|
|-
| 154Nd
| style="text-align:right" | 60
| style="text-align:right" | 94
| 153.92948(12)
| 25.9(2) s
| β−
| 154Pm
| 0+
|
|
|-
| style="text-indent:1em" | 154m1Nd
| colspan="3" style="text-indent:2em" | 480(150)# keV
| 1.3(5) µs
|
|
|
|
|
|-
| style="text-indent:1em" | 154m2Nd
| colspan="3" style="text-indent:2em" | 1349(10) keV
| >1 µs
|
|
| (5−)
|
|
|-
| 155Nd
| style="text-align:right" | 60
| style="text-align:right" | 95
| 154.93293(16)#
| 8.9(2) s
| β−
| 155Pm
| 3/2−#
|
|
|-
| 156Nd
| style="text-align:right" | 60
| style="text-align:right" | 96
| 155.93502(22)
| 5.49(7) s
| β−
| 156Pm
| 0+
|
|
|-
| style="text-indent:1em" | 156mNd
| colspan="3" style="text-indent:2em" | 1432(5) keV
| 135 ns
|
|
| 5−
|
|
|-
| 157Nd
| style="text-align:right" | 60
| style="text-align:right" | 97
| 156.93903(21)#
| 2# s [>300 ns]
| β−
| 157Pm
| 5/2−#
|
|
|-
| 158Nd
| style="text-align:right" | 60
| style="text-align:right" | 98
| 157.94160(43)#
| 700# ms [>300 ns]
| β−
| 158Pm
| 0+
|
|
|-
| 159Nd
| style="text-align:right" | 60
| style="text-align:right" | 99
| 158.94609(54)#
| 500# ms
| β−
| 159Pm
| 7/2+#
|
|
|-
| 160Nd
| style="text-align:right" | 60
| style="text-align:right" | 100
| 159.94909(64)#
| 300# ms
| β−
| 160Pm
| 0+
|
|
|-
| 161Nd
| style="text-align:right" | 60
| style="text-align:right" | 101
| 160.95388(75)#
| 200# ms
| β−
| 161Pm
| 1/2−#
|
|

References 

 Isotope masses from:

 Isotopic compositions and standard atomic masses from:

 Half-life, spin, and isomer data selected from the following sources.

 
Neodymium
Neodymium